Ludmila Belcencova is a Moldovan politician.

She has been a member of the Parliament of Moldova since 2009.

External links 
 Site-ul Parlamentului Republicii Moldova

References

1972 births
Living people
Moldovan MPs 2009–2010
Moldovan female MPs
Party of Communists of the Republic of Moldova politicians
21st-century Moldovan women politicians